The Kids from "Fame" is the first album released by the cast of the American TV series Fame. It was released in 1982 and featured the hit singles "Hi Fidelity" and "Starmaker". The album was a major global success, most notably in the United Kingdom, where it stayed at the top of the UK Album Chart for 12 weeks.

Overview 
The US TV series Fame became an international success, most prominently in the United Kingdom and Republic of Ireland, where the series debuted in June 1982 on BBC One and RTE One respectively, and achieved high ratings for both networks. The first song from the series to be released in both countries, "Hi Fidelity", peaked at number five and number three on the UK Singles Chart and Irish Singles Chart respectively. Simultaneously, this album was released in July 1982 and quickly topped the UK Album Chart, remaining at the top of the chart for 12 weeks. Soon after, a second song "Starmaker" was released and became an even bigger success in the United Kingdom and Republic or Ireland than its predecessor, peaking at number three and number one on the UK Singles Chart and Irish Singles Chart respectively. The album ended the year as Britain's second-best selling album of 1982, beaten only by Barbra Streisand's Love Songs album. It remained on the UK Album Chart for 46 weeks and sold over a million copies - the biggest-selling album ever released by BBC Records (who had licensed the songs from RCA).

The album was also a top 30 hit in Norway, Sweden, the Netherlands and New Zealand, but only managed to reach #146 in the US. A third single was released in the Netherlands, "Life is a Celebration". In the United Kingdom, a follow-up album The Kids from "Fame" Again was released just three months later, and peaked at number two on the UK Album Chart.

The album was released on Compact Disc in 2000.

Track listing 
Side one
 "Starmaker" (Bruce Roberts, Carole Bayer Sager) 4:07
 "I Can Do Anything Better Than You Can" (David Wolfert, Sandy Linzer) 3:05
 "I Still Believe in Me" (Gary Portnoy, Susan Sheridan) 3:26 
 "Life is a Celebration" (Rick Springfield) 3:06
 "Step Up to the Mike" (Alan Gordon) 3.33
Side two
 "Hi-Fidelity" (Enid Levine) 2:46
 "We Got the Power" (Barry Fasman, Steve Sperry) 3:23
 "It's Gonna be a Long Night" (Estelle Levitt, Gary Portnoy) 4:01
 "Desdemona" (Barry Fasman, Steve Sperry) 3:38
 "Be My Music" (Ethan Hurt, Lee Curreri) 3:36

Charts

Personnel 
Arranger – Barry Fasman
Concertmaster– Sid Sharp 
Coordinator [Production]– Linda Gerrity
Engineer– Joe Robb, John Arrias, John Mills, Mike Lietz, Stuart Graham, Tony D'Amico
Executive-Producer– Charles Koppelman, Martin Bandier
Producer – Barry Fasman
Guitar– Dean Parks, Greg Poree, Michael Landau, Mitch Holder
Keyboards, Synthesizer– David Garfield, Jai Winding, John Hobbs, Lee Curreri, Michael Boddicker, Robbie Buchanan
Bass– Andy Muson, Dennis Belfield, Nathan East
Drums– David Kemper, Rick Shlosser
Percussion– Gary Coleman, Steve Forman
Backing Vocals– Carl Graves, Clydene Jackson, Denise DeCaro, Gail Heideman, Joseph Williams, Julia Waters, Kathy Burch, Luther Waters, Mark Creamer, Marti McCall, Maxine Waters, Mendy Lee, Nick Uhrig, Oren Waters, Steve Sperry
Mastering– Chris Bellman
Art Direction, Design– Glenn Parsons, Tim Bryant
Photography – Ron Slenzak
A&R (Coordinator)– Marge Meoli

References 

Fame (franchise)

1982 albums
1982 soundtrack albums
RCA Records albums
Television soundtracks